Rubens Bertogliati (born 9 May 1979 in Lugano) is a Swiss retired road racing cyclist, whose breakthrough came in the 2002 Tour de France, when he was riding for the Italian  team.

Bertogliati won the first stage of the Tour, which took place in the hilly country of Luxembourg. The victory also earned him the yellow jersey as leader of the general classification. He kept the jersey after stage two, when he finished in 29th position. After the third stage, German sprinter Erik Zabel took the leader's yellow jersey from Bertogliati.

Bertogliati's first win came a few months earlier at the GP Chiasso, but it was his efforts in July that made him famous. He started his career as a professional with the  team in 2000. From 2004 to 2008 he rode for the Spanish  team.

Major results

2001
3rd Time trial, National Road Championships
9th Grand Prix des Nations
2002
Tour de France
1st Stage 1
Held  after Stages 1 and 2
1st GP Chiasso
3rd Time trial, National Road Championships
8th Japan Cup
2003
8th Overall International Tour of Rhodes
2005
10th Firenze–Pistoia
2007
4th Overall Tour de Georgia
6th Japan Cup
2008
5th Chrono des Nations
2009
1st  Time trial, National Road Championships
7th Overall Circuit Cycliste Sarthe
2010
1st  Time trial, National Road Championships
7th Chrono des Herbiers
2011
4th Time trial, National Road Championships
2012
8th Overall Tour of the Gila

References

External links
Official website Rubens Bertogliati
Profile on Saunier Duval-Prodir official website

1979 births
Cyclists at the 2004 Summer Olympics
Living people
Olympic cyclists of Switzerland
Swiss male cyclists
Swiss people of Italian descent
Swiss Tour de France stage winners
Sportspeople from Lugano